Yesipchuk or Esipchuk is a gender-neutral surname. Notable people with the surname include:

Dmitry Yesipchuk (born 1974), Russian race walker 
Oksana Esipchuk (born 1976), Russian discus thrower

Russian-language surnames